Daniar Dshunussow қаз: Данияр Жүнісов (born March 12, 1986) is a Kazakh-German professional ice hockey goaltender who is currently an unrestricted free agent. He most recently played for Kölner Haie in the Deutsche Eishockey Liga (DEL). He joined the Sharks as a free agent, signing a one-year contract on April 10, 2015, after spending the 2014–15 season with the Iserlohn Roosters.

Awards and honours

References

External links

1986 births
Living people
Eisbären Berlin players
German ice hockey goaltenders
Hamburg Freezers players
Iserlohn Roosters players
Kölner Haie players
Grizzlys Wolfsburg players